The Abbey of St. Jean des Vignes was a monastery of Augustinian canons in Soissons, France, southwest of the city center. Only ruins remain, of which the west facade remains one of the more outstanding examples of architecture in the town. It is a listed historic monument.

History
The abbey was founded on St. John's hill in 1076 by Hughes Le Blanc as a community of Augustinian canons.

Initially built in Romanesque style, the initial buildings were replaced at the end of the 12th century by those extant today. The west facade was begun in the 12th century, but not finished until the 16th. The refectory and cellar date from the 13th century, parts of the cloisters from the end of the 13th century, while other parts are from the 16th century, as is the abbot's lodging.

When the abbey was suppressed during the French Revolution the premises were put to use for military purposes, and an arsenal was added.

The site was acquired by the town of Soissons in the 1970s and the remaining buildings are now occupied by educational and heritage-related organizations.

Sources
Soissons Municipal website: St. Jean des Vignes Abbey 
Saint-Jean-des-Vignes: Archaeology, Architecture, and History of an Augustinian Monastery

References

1076 establishments in Europe
1070s establishments in France
18th-century disestablishments in France
Augustinian monasteries in France
Monasteries in Aisne
Christian monasteries established in the 11th century
History of Picardy
Tourist attractions in Aisne